Hugh Lynas (1865 – 3 December 1938) was a British trade unionist.

Born in Glasgow, Lynas received just two years of elementary schooling.  He became a labourer, and joined the National Union of Gasworkers and General Labourers.  In March 1896 he was elected as secretary of its Sunderland District, this later becoming the union's Northern District.  He was regarded as one of the union's most effective organisers, and by 1910 it had the third-highest membership of any in the union.  In 1908, he persuaded the union to affiliated to the General Labourers' National Council.  When the union merged into the new National Union of General and Municipal Workers, he retained his post, standing down in 1937.

Lynas served on the Sunderland School Board and Board of Guardians, and from 1919 was a magistrate.

References

1865 births
1938 deaths
English trade unionists
Trade unionists from Glasgow